Ethmia hainanensis is a moth in the family Depressariidae. It was described by You-Qiao Liu in 1980. It is found in Guangdong, China.

Adults resemble Ethmia acontias, but can be distinguished by the breaks in the first and second black stripe on the forewings.

References

Moths described in 1980
hainanensis